Alexander Earle (born 12 February 1977) is a Puerto Rican equestrian. He competed in the individual jumping event at the 1996 Summer Olympics.

References

External links
 

1977 births
Living people
Puerto Rican male equestrians
Olympic equestrians of Puerto Rico
Equestrians at the 1996 Summer Olympics
Place of birth missing (living people)